"That's How Murder Snowballs" is the fifth episode of the 1969 ITC British television series Randall and Hopkirk (Deceased) starring Mike Pratt, Kenneth Cope and Annette Andre. Directed by Paul Dickson and written by Ray Austin, the episode was first broadcast on 19 October 1969 on ITV.

Synopsis

Overview
In this episode themes of morality are raised when after Fernadez is murdered Jeff tips off a newspaper contact named Barry Jones who pays him well for story information. Jeannie on the other hand shows some moral compunction by questioning Jeff's ethics in selling a story. "Well, did you get your blood money?" she demands of Jeff.

We also learn that Jeff once paid Jeannie with a gold earring "in lieu of salary" again revealing his financial difficulties.

Jeff is hit many times in this episode. He is coshed over the head, shot at four times, nearly hit with a large sandbag and a thrown revolver, and worst of all is knocked out by a shelf tipped on him in the basement as he is searching for clues.

Meanwhile, in this episode Marty acquires a taste for dining at the finest restaurants, remarking that he had recently dined at the Savoy with the Prime Minister (at the time Harold Wilson).

Cast

Mike Pratt as Jeff Randall
Kenneth Cope as Marty Hopkirk
Annette Andre as Jeannie Hopkirk
Robin Askwith as Call boy
Simon Barnes as Man with Cards
James Belchamber as Mark
Harold Berens as Tony Lang
Arthur Brough as Snowy
John Cazabon as Doctor
Grazina Frame as Gloria Marsh
Michael Griffiths as Inspector Nelson
Patrick Holt as Barry Jones
Stuart Hoyle as Kim
David Jason as Abel
Valerie Leon as Kay
Marie Makine as Old Lady (credited as Marie Makino)
John Styles as Ventriloquist
Tony Thawnton as Fernandez

Production
Although the 5th episode in the series, That's How Murder Snowballs was the 11th episode to be shot, filmed between October and November 1968.
The theatre used in this episode is the Palace Theatre, Watford, Herts. The music used for Gloria Marsh's song is lifted from The Saint episode Portrait of Brenda, first shown in February 1969.

Silent behind-the-scenes footage of this episode was included as an extra on the fourth-region 2 DVD. Shot by a second unit crew using stand-ins for the leads, the sequence runs to 1 minute, 6 seconds.

See also

1969 in television

References

External links

Episode overview at Randallandhopkirk.org.uk
Filming locations at Randallandhopkirk.org.uk

Randall and Hopkirk (Deceased) episodes
1969 British television episodes